Luis Alberto de Herrera (Montevideo, 22 July 1873 – 8 April 1959) was a Uruguayan lawyer, diplomat, journalist and politician.

Political and diplomatic roles
A national leader of great importance during the first half of the 20th century, he led the National Party through the most decisive instances along five decades. His own political movement is known as Herrerismo.

From 1902 to 1904, he was Uruguayan Minister Plenipotentiary to the United States.

From 1925 to 1927 he served as President of the National Council of Administration, or Prime Minister, during the presidency of José Serrato.

In 1933, he took part at the Convention on Rights and Duties of States adopted by the Seventh International Conference of American States. Particularly after 1933, he was tactically close to his nominal Colorado Party opponent, President Gabriel Terra.

He stood for the presidency several times without success. In 1958, however, he led the Blancos to their first nationwide victory in over 90 years, taking a majority on the National Council of Government. He died shortly afterward.

Family
He was married to Margarita Uriarte (widow of Alberto Heber Jackson) with whom he had one daughter, María Hortensia.

His grandson Luis Alberto Lacalle served as President of Uruguay in 1990–1995; and his great-grandson Luis Alberto Lacalle Pou served as a deputy from 2000 to 2015 and as a senator from 2015 until he was elected President in 2019.

Ideas and legacy
Knowing about Herrera's ideas is essential in order to understand the National Party of Uruguay. He was an advocate of Americanism and Nationalism; a traditionalist, his style was that of a typical caudillo, but in a more urban style. He practically dominated his party's life as a leader.

See also
 National Party (Uruguay)#History
 Museo de la Casa de Luis Alberto de Herrera
 List of political families#Uruguay
 Politics of Uruguay

References

External links

Candidates for President of Uruguay
1873 births
1959 deaths
Uruguayan cattlemen
19th-century Uruguayan lawyers
Ambassadors of Uruguay to the United States
National Council of Government (Uruguay)
National Party (Uruguay) politicians
Burials at the Central Cemetery of Montevideo
Honorary Knights Grand Cross of the Order of the British Empire
Prime Ministers of Uruguay